J.M. Huber Corporation is a large corporation in the United States. The J.M. Huber Corporation received IMD-Lombard Odier Global Family Business Award for 2013.

History
The J.M. Huber Corporation was founded in 1883 by Joseph Maria Huber, an immigrant from Prussia (now Germany). It is still owned by the Huber family, which is entering its sixth generation of shareholders.

Overview
The J.M. Huber Corporation is headquartered in Edison, New Jersey. Its Chief Executive Officer is Michael Marberry.

Huber's product portfolio covers a diverse range of consumer and industrial items, including oral care and personal care, food and beverage, flame retardants and smoke suppressants, forestry management and building materials.

The company comprises four subsidiaries: CP Kelco, Huber Engineered Materials, Huber Engineered Woods, and Huber Resources.

CP Kelco has six plants—Großenbrode, Germany (Pectin); Lille Skensved, Denmark (Pectin, Carrageenan, Refined Locust Bean Gum); Okmulgee, Oklahoma (Xanthan Gum); San Diego, California (Xanthan Gum, Gellan Gum); Rizhao, China (Xanthan Gum, Diutan Gum); and, Limeira, Brazil (Pectin).

References

1883 establishments in the United States